The Gilman Coggin House is a historic house in Reading, Massachusetts.  The -story wood-frame house is a fine well preserved local example of Greek Revival architecture.  It was built in 1847 by Gilman Coggin, owner of a local shoe-manufacturing business.  The house's front gable is fully pedimented, supported by wide corner pilasters.  A single-story wraparound porch has square Ionic columns, and the front door surround is flanked by half-length sidelight windows and topped by a fanlight transom.

The house was listed on the National Register of Historic Places in 1984.

See also
National Register of Historic Places listings in Reading, Massachusetts
National Register of Historic Places listings in Middlesex County, Massachusetts

References

Houses on the National Register of Historic Places in Reading, Massachusetts
Houses in Reading, Massachusetts
1847 establishments in Massachusetts
Houses completed in 1847